The following highways are numbered 712:

Costa Rica
 National Route 712

United States